Jack Deth is the main protagonist in the Trancers films, which were originally produced by Charles Band of Empire Pictures, and later Full Moon Entertainment, from 1984 to 2013.

Jack Deth is a wisecracking police detective in Angel City (formerly Los Angeles) and is portrayed by Tim Thomerson in six out of the seven films, as well as having a cameo appearance in the movie Evil Bong. 
Jack's job is finding and killing "Trancers"—the zombie-like sub-humans who obey the command of the powerful and (often psychic) villains throughout the series.

Appearances

Films

Trancers

Jack Deth is a cop from the 23rd century in Angel City (the renamed Los Angeles, following an earthquake). Jack is brought out of retirement by the council of Angel City, who want him to re-capture Trancer mastermind Martin Whistler, who had escaped back to the year 1985 with a plan to assassinate the ancestors of Angel City's three ruling governors, ensuring they'd never be born. Using a special serum, Jack's consciousness is sent back to 1985. Upon arriving in the body of his ancestor Philip Dethton, Jack meets Lena (Helen Hunt) who assists him as he finds and kills Whistler.  Jack chooses to remain in 1985 with Lena.

Trancers: City of Lost Angels

A Trancers segment was originally planned for inclusion as part of an anthology film called Pulse Pounders. However, the movie was never completed due to budget restraints and the collapse of Empire Pictures. After this, Charles Band founded the Full Moon company, and the basis for that film was used in Trancers II. The 'lost footage' (really, just around 20 minutes) from Pulse Pounders was digitally remastered  and made into Trancers: City of Lost Angels (otherwise known as Trancers 1.5), that was made available for download via fullmoonstreaming.com but then released on DVD in November, 2013. In that short movie, Deth has to fend off against a dangerous female assassin.

Trancers II

Set in 1991, Jack has married Lena. Dr. E.D. Wardo, Whistler's brother, had begun trancing mental patients and homeless people using an addictive drug from the future called scurbosa, which he has been growing in a nearby greenhouse using smuggled seeds. In order to stop Wardo, Jack's first wife, Alice Stillwell, had been resurrected, but was still trapped inside the body of her ancestor, who just happened to be a mental patient herself. After Lena is captured by Wardo's men, Jack and Alice track Wardo down to his scurbosa greenhouse and kill him. Alice is sent into the future while Jack chooses to remain in the present with Lena.

Trancers III

In 1992, Jack was forcefully returned to the future by the android Shark. There, the remaining council leader, Harris, and Alice have Jack go to 2005 in order to end a Trancers scheme that was fully sponsored by the government. Jack was once again able to stop the Trancers and program director Col. Daddy Muthuh with help from Lena (now happily remarried and with a daughter).  After  that battle ended, the Trancers seemed to have been wiped out for good.

Trancers 4: Jack of Swords

During an assignment, a stowaway creature called a Solonoid caused Deth's time machine to make a crash landing in another dimension called Orpheus. Jack gets caught up in a war between the surviving humans and the never-before-seen vampire like Trancers called Nobles, as well as their fearsome leader, Lord Caliban.

Trancers 5: Sudden Deth

Still in Orpheus, Jack learns of a talisman called the Tiamond that could allow the possessor to cross dimensional realms. Jack and his companion Prospero journey to the Castle of Unrelenting Terror to obtain it, so that Jack could return to Angel City. Jack uses the Tiamond to return to L.A., somehow bringing Prospero with him.

Trancers 6

Jack learns from Dr. Jennings that he fathered a daughter called Josephine. Josephine was in danger because she saw a meteor fall to the Earth, which contained an alien Trancer. 
Jack inhabits Josphine's body when the newest group of Trancers appeared in her time and began using the energy from the meteor to mass-produce more Trancers. Once he defeats the Trancers, Jack decides to remain in the guise of his daughter, in case the Trancers should return.

Other films

Thomerson (as Jack Deth) appeared in the 2006 movie, Evil Bong, briefly talking to someone in a dream-like state. Other Full Moon-related characters also appear in this film, including Ivan Burroughs from Decadent Evil and the cackling Jack Attack from the Demonic Toys movies, although Evil Bong isn't canonical.

Merchandise 

Eternity Comics released  a short Trancers series in the 1990s. Another Trancers comic was issued in 2015.

References 

Fictional police officers
Fictional police detectives
Film characters introduced in 1985
Science fiction film characters
Male characters in film
Trancers (film series)